Sour cream (in North American English, Australian English and New Zealand English) or soured cream (British English) is a dairy product obtained by fermenting regular cream with certain kinds of lactic acid bacteria. The bacterial culture, which is introduced either deliberately or naturally, sours and thickens the cream. Its name comes from the production of lactic acid by bacterial fermentation, which is called souring. Crème fraîche is one type of sour cream with a high fat content and less sour taste.

Traditional 
Traditionally, sour cream was made by letting cream that was skimmed off the top of milk ferment at a moderate temperature. It can also be prepared by the souring of pasteurized cream with acid-producing bacterial culture. The bacteria that developed during fermentation thickened the cream and made it more acidic, a natural way of preserving it.

Commercial varieties 

According to US (FDA) regulations, commercially produced sour cream contains no less than 18% milkfat before bulking agents are added, and no less than 14.4% milkfat in the finished product. Additionally, it must have a total acidity of no less than 0.5%. It may also contain milk and whey solids, buttermilk, starch in an amount not exceeding one percent, salt, and rennet derived from aqueous extracts from the fourth stomach of calves, kids or lambs, in an amount consistent with good manufacturing practice. In addition, according to the Canadian food regulations, the emulsifying, gelling, stabilizing and thickening agents in sour cream are algin, carob bean gum (locust bean gum), carrageenan, gelatin, guar gum, pectin, or propylene glycol alginate or any combination thereof in an amount not exceeding 0.5 percent, monoglycerides, mono- and diglycerides, or any combination thereof, in an amount not exceeding 0.3 percent, and sodium phosphate dibasic in an amount not exceeding 0.05 percent.

Sour cream is not fully fermented, and like many dairy products, must be refrigerated unopened and after use. Additionally, in Canadian regulations, a milk-coagulating enzyme derived from Rhizomucor miehei (Cooney and Emerson) from Mucor pusillus Lindt by pure culture fermentation process or from Aspergillus oryzae RET-1 (pBoel777) can also be added into sour cream production process, in an amount consistent with good manufacturing practice. Sour cream is sold with an expiration date stamped on the container, though whether this is a "sell by", a "best by" or a "use by" date varies with local regulation. Refrigerated unopened sour cream can last for 1–2 weeks beyond its sell by date. Once it has been opened, refrigerated sour cream generally lasts for 7–10 days.

Physical-chemical properties

Ingredients 
Cultured cream.

Processed sour cream can include any of the following additives and preservatives: grade A whey, modified food starch, sodium phosphate, sodium citrate, guar gum, carrageenan, calcium sulfate, potassium sorbate, and locust bean gum.

Processing 
The manufacturing of sour cream begins with the standardization of fat content; this step is to ensure that the desired or legal amount of milk fat is present. As previously mentioned the minimum amount of milk fat that must be present in sour cream is 18%. During this step in the manufacturing process other dry ingredients are added to the cream; additional grade A whey for example would be added at this time. Another additive used during this processing step are a series of ingredients known as stabilizers. The common stabilizers that are added to sour cream are polysaccharides and gelatin, including modified food starch, guar gum, and carrageenans. The reasoning behind the addition of stabilizers to fermented dairy products is to provide smoothness in the body and texture of the product. The stabilizers also assist in the gel structure of the product and reduce whey syneresis. The formation of these gel structures, leaves less free water for whey syneresis, thereby extending the shelf life. Whey syneresis is the loss of moisture by the expulsion of whey. This expulsion of whey can occur during the transportation of containers holding the sour cream, due to the susceptibility to motion and agitation. The next step in the manufacturing process is the acidification of the cream. Organic acids such as citric acid or sodium citrate are added to the cream prior to homogenization in order to increase the metabolic activity of the starter culture. To prepare the mixture for homogenization, it is heated for a short period of time.

Homogenization is a processing method that is utilized to improve the quality of the sour cream in regards to the color, consistency, creaming stability, and creaminess of the cultured cream. During homogenization larger fat globules within the cream are broken down into smaller sized globules to allow an even suspension within the system. At this point in the processing the milk fat globules and the casein proteins are not interacting with each other, there is repulsion occurring.  The mixture is homogenized, under high pressure homogenization above 130 bar (unit) and at a high temperature of 60 °C. The formation of the small globules (below 2 microns in size) previously mentioned allows for reducing a cream layer formation and increases the viscosity of the product. There is also a reduction in the separation of whey, enhancing the white color of the sour cream.

After homogenization of the cream, the mixture must undergo pasteurization. Pasteurization is a mild heat treatment of the cream, with the purpose of killing any harmful bacteria in the cream. The homogenized cream undergoes high temperature short time (HTST) pasteurization method. In this type of pasteurization the cream is heated to the high temperature of  85 °C for thirty minutes. This processing step allows for a sterile medium for when it is time to introduce the starter bacteria.

After the process of pasteurization, there is a cooling process where the mixture is cooled down to a temperature of 20˚C. The reason that the mixture was cooled down to the temperature of 20˚C is due to the fact that this is an ideal temperature for mesophilic inoculation. After the homogenized cream has been cooled to 20˚C, it is inoculated with 1-2% active starter culture. The type of starter culture utilized is essential for the production of sour cream. The starter culture is responsible for initiating the fermentation process by enabling the homogenized cream to reach the pH of 4.5 to 4.8. Lactic acid bacteria (hereto known as LAB) ferment lactose to lactic acid, they are mesophilic, Gram-positive facultative anaerobes. The strains of LAB that are utilized to allow the fermentation of sour cream production are Lactococcus lactis subsp. latic or Lactococcus lactis subsp. cremoris, which are lactic acid bacteria associated with producing the acid. The LAB that are known for producing the aromas in sour cream are Lactococcus lactis ssp. lactis biovar diacetyllactis. Together these bacteria produce compounds that will lower the pH of the mixture, and produce flavor compounds such as diacetyl.

After the inoculation of starter culture, the cream is portioned in packages. For 18 hours a fermentation process takes place in which the pH is lowered from 6.5 to 4.6. After fermentation, one more cooling process takes place. After this cooling process, the sour cream is packaged into their final containers and sent to the market.

Physical-chemical changes 
During the pasteurization process, temperatures are raised past the point where all the particles in the system are stable. When cream is heated to temperatures above 70 °C, there is denaturation of whey proteins. To avoid phase separation brought on by the increased surface area, the fat globules readily bind with the denatured β-lactoglobulin. The adsorption of the denatured whey proteins (and whey proteins that bound with casein micelles) increases the number of structural components in the product; the texture of sour cream can be partly attributed to this. The denaturation of whey proteins is also known for increasing the strength of the cross-linking within the cream system, due to the formation of whey protein polymers.

When the cream is inoculated with starter bacteria and the bacteria begins converting lactose to lactic acid, the pH begins a slow decrease. When this decrease begins, dissolution of calcium phosphate occurs, and causes a rapid drop in the pH. During the processing step, fermentation the pH was dropped from 6.5 to 4.6, this drop in pH brings on a physicochemical change to the casein micelles. Recall the casein proteins are heat stable, but they are not stable in certain acidic conditions. The colloidal particles are stable at the normal pH of milk which is 6.5-6.7, the micelles will precipitate at the isoelectric point (pI) of milk which is a pH of 4.6. At a pH of 6.5 the casein micelles repulse each other due to the electronegativity of the outer layer of the micelle. During this drop in pH there is a reduction in zeta potential, from the highly net negative charges in cream to no net charge when approaching the pI.  The formula shown is the Henry's equation, where z: zeta potential, Ue: electrophoretic mobility, ε: dielectric constant, η: viscosity, and f(ka): Henry's function. This equation is used to find the zeta potential, which is calculated to find the electrokinetic potential in colloidal dispersions. Through electrostatic interactions the casein molecules begin approaching and aggregating together. The casein proteins enter a more ordered system, attributing to a strong gel structure formation. The whey proteins that were denatured in the heating steps of processing, are insoluble at this acidic pH and are precipitated with casein.

The interactions involved in gelation and aggregation of casein micelles are hydrogen bonds, hydrophobic interactions, electrostatic attractions and van der Waals attractions  These interactions are highly dependent on pH, temperature and time. At the isoelectric point, the net surface charge of casein micelle is zero and a minimum of electrostatic repulsion can be expected. Furthermore, aggregation is taking place due to dominating hydrophobic interactions. Differences in the zeta potential of milk can be caused by differences in ionic strength differences, which in turn depend on the amount of calcium present in the milk. The stability of milk is largely due to the electrostatic repulsion of casein micelles. These casein micelles aggregated and precipitated when they approach the absolute zeta potential values at pH 4.0 – 4.5. When the heat treated and denatured, whey protein is covering the casein micelle, isoelectric point of the micelle elevated to the isoelectric point of β lactoglobulin (approximately pH 5.3).

Rheological properties 

Sour cream exhibits time-dependent thixotropic behaviors. Thixotropic fluids reduce in viscosity as work is applied, and when the product is no longer under stress, the fluid returns to its previous viscosity. The viscosity of sour cream at room temperature is 100,000 cP, (for comparison: water has a viscosity of 1 cP  at 20 °C). The thixotropic properties exhibited by sour cream are what make it such a versatile product in the food industry.

Uses 

Sour cream is commonly used as a condiment on foods, or combined with other ingredients to form a dipping sauce. It can be added to soups and sauces to help thicken and make them creamy, or in baking to help increase the moisture level over and above using milk. 

In Tex–Mex cuisine, it is often used as a substitute for crema in nachos, tacos, burritos, and taquitos.

See also 

 Crema
 Crème fraîche
 Cream cheese
 Fermented milk products
 List of dairy products
 List of dips
 Smetana
 Pomazánkové máslo
 Souring
 Yogurt

References

Further reading
  
 —notes on the industrial production process for sour cream and yogurt.

External links 
 

Fermented dairy products
Sour foodsy:
Dairy products
Condiments
Mexican cuisine
Western cuisine
English cuisine
British cuisine
European cuisine
Israeli cuisine
Mediterranean cuisine
North American cuisine
Central American cuisine
South American cuisine
Australian cuisine
Canadian cuisine
New Zealand cuisine